was one of the administrative divisions of Korea under Japanese rule, with its capital at Zenshū (present day Jeonju, South Korea). The province consisted of what is now the South Korean province of North Jeolla.

Population

Number of people by nationality according to the 1936 census:

 Overall population: 1,540,686 people
 Japanese: 35,844 people
 Koreans: 1,502,380 people
 Other: 2,462 people

Administrative divisions

The following list is based on the administrative divisions of 1945:

Cities

Zenshū (capital)
Gunzan

Counties 

Kanshū
Chin'an
Kinzan
Moshu
Chōsui
Ninjitsu
Nangen
Junshō
Seiyū
Kōshō
Fuan
Kintei
Yokkō
Ekizan

Provincial governors

The following people were provincial ministers before August 1919. This was then changed to the title of governor.

See also
Provinces of Korea
Governor-General of Chōsen
Administrative divisions of Korea

References

Korea under Japanese rule
Former prefectures of Japan in Korea